Emergency Contact may refer to:

 Emergency management
 Emergency telephone number
 "Emergency Contact", a 2017 episode of Will & Grace
 Emergency Contact (novel), a 2018 novel by Mary H.K. Choi